The Misol snake eel (Yirrkala misolensis) is an eel in the family Ophichthidae (worm/snake eels). It was described by Albert Günther in 1872, originally under the genus Ophichthys. It is a marine, tropical eel which is known from the western central Pacific Ocean.

References

Ophichthidae
Fish described in 1872
Taxa named by Albert Günther